Ainharp is a commune in the Pyrénées-Atlantiques department in the Nouvelle-Aquitaine region in southwestern France.

The inhabitants of the commune are known as Ainharbars. or Ainharbear.

Geography

Location
Ainharp is located some 50 km west by southwest of Pau, 15 km southeast of Saint-Palais, and 10 km north-west of Mauleon-Licharre. It is part of the former province of Soule.

Access
The commune can be accessed by road D242 from Lohitzun-Oyhercq in the west passing through the village and continuing southeast to Mauleon-Licharre. The D344 road also goes to the north from the village through the commune then east to Espes-Undurein. The commune terrain is undulating of mixed farmland and forest.

Hydrography
Located in the drainage basin of the Adour, the commune is the source of numerous streams including the Lagardoye which forms part of the south-eastern border, the Quihilleri which forms much of the western border, and the Lafaure which forms much of the northern border.

Localities and hamlets

 Agueberria
 Agueberriborda
 Aisaguerpia
 Aranco
 Armagnague
 Arranchiaga
 Barrechia
 Bente
 Bidartia
 Bidegainia
 Bolondo
 Bordagaya
 Bordalecu
 Cabanna
 Cacoa
 Carricaburu
 Carricabuya
 Carricart
 Chorho
 Elhorria
 Elhorriberry
 Erreguenia
 Estecachoury
 Etchebarnia
 Etchebestemborda
 Etchecopar
 Garay
 Habiague
 Intsauspia
 Jaigüberria
 Larria
 Leiciagueçahar
 Lohitzun
 Mercapidia
 Oyhemburia
 Oyhenart
 Palasiona
 Pekeix
 Sallaberria
 Urruty
 Uthuriet

Toponymy
The commune name in Basque is Ainharbe.

Jean-Baptiste Orpustan proposed two etymological interpretations:
a meaning of "low heather" from ilharr meaning "heather" and -be (from behere meaning "low") or
"height of the low rocks" from gain meaning "high" and har meaning "rock" that indicates the high position of the village on the left bank of the Saison.

The following table details the origins of the commune name and other names in the commune.

Sources:
Raymond: Topographic Dictionary of the Department of Basses-Pyrenees, 1863, on the page numbers indicated in the table. 
Orpustan: Jean-Baptiste Orpustan,   New Basque Toponymy

Origins:
Notaries: Notaries of Labastide-Villefranche
Ohix:Contracts retained by Ohix, Notary of Soule
Insinuations: Insinuations of the Diocese of Oloron 
Reformation: Reformation of Béarn

History
Paul Raymond noted on page 4 of his 1863 dictionary that the commune was a former priory in the diocese of Oloron and that there was a hospital for pilgrims.

Administration
List of Successive Mayors of Ainharp

Mayors from 1929

Inter-communality
Ainharp is a member of seven intercommunal structures:
the Communauté d'agglomération du Pays Basque
the association to support Basque culture
the intercommunal association of the Valley
the intercommunal association for the construction and operation of the CES of Mauleon
the AEP association for Soule Country
the remediation association for Soule Country
the energy association of the Pyrénées-Atlantiques

Population

Economy
The activity is mainly agricultural (maize and livestock). The town is part of the Appellation d'origine contrôlée (AOC) zone of Ossau-iraty.

Culture and heritage

Religious Heritage

The commune has a church which dates back to the 11th century and a Calvary-Bell Tower from the 17th century. Its cemetery features Hilarri dating from the time of the bell tower.
 
The village is located on a secondary road of the pilgrimage to Saint Jacques de Compostela which passes on the highway to Ports de Cize, the priory of Saint-Palais to Saint-Michel-le-Vieux which had a hospice for pilgrims called Benta then to L'Hôpital-Saint-Blaise, Osserain, Pagolle, Roquiague, Haux, Larrau, and Ordiarp.

Facilities
The commune has a primary school.

See also
Communes of the Pyrénées-Atlantiques department

References

External links
Ainharp on Géoportail, National Geographic Institute (IGN) website 
Ainharp on the 1750 Cassini Map

Communes of Pyrénées-Atlantiques